Venoy is a commune in the Yonne department in Bourgogne-Franche-Comté in north-central France.

The commune of Venoy groups seventeen hamlets:
Venoy (the main village), La Brosse, Le Buisson, La Chapelle-le-Bas, La Chapelle-le-Haut, La Coudre, Curly, Égriselles, La Belle-Étoile, Montallery, Montpierreux, Montreuche, Pontagny, Sainte-Anne, Soleines-le-Bas, Soleines-le-Milieu, Soleines-le-Haut.

See also
Communes of the Yonne department

References

Communes of Yonne